Mount Nangō ( = Nangō-San) is a mountain with a height of 810 meters, located about 1.0 kilometer east of Mount Maku in Yugawara, Kanagawa, Japan. It is a volcanic lava dome formed about 150,000 years ago in the older rim of Mount Hakone. 

The summit of Mount Nangō is a grass field, where you can command a great view of the Manazuru Peninsula as well as the Izu Islands in Sagami Bay.

See also
Fuji-Hakone-Izu National Park

References

External link

 

Mountains of Kanagawa Prefecture
Hakone, Kanagawa
Yugawara, Kanagawa